Svea Rike II is a 1998 turn-based strategy video game. It is the sequel to Svea Rike and was followed up by Europa Universalis: Crown of the North.

Plot
Based on the history of Sweden, it opens in 1471 during the Battle of Brunkeberg.

References

1998 video games
Classic Mac OS games
Turn-based strategy video games
Video games developed in Sweden
Video games set in Sweden
Windows games